The Alliance for Change (APC) is a Venezuelan political party located on the centre-left of the political spectrum. It formalized its registration to the National Electoral Council on August 1, 2013.

It was founded by Andrés Avelino Álvarez, Ricardo Sánchez Mujica and Carlos Vargas who were previously national deputies for the Democratic Unity Roundtable (MUD) following the 2010 parliamentary election. They left the MUD after the 2012 presidential election.

Originally in opposition to President Nicolás Maduro, it has since joined the ruling Great Patriotic Pole and is critical of the MUD.

External links
Facebook page
Twitter page

2013 establishments in Venezuela
Bolivarian Revolution
Political parties established in 2013
Political parties in Venezuela
Social democratic parties in Venezuela